Pickering—Uxbridge is a federal electoral district in Ontario. It consists of the City of Pickering and the Township of Uxbridge.

Pickering—Uxbridge was created by the 2012 federal electoral boundaries redistribution and was legally defined in the 2013 representation order. It came into effect upon the call of the 42nd Canadian federal election, scheduled for 19 October 2015. It was created out of parts of Pickering—Scarborough East, Ajax—Pickering and Durham.

Demographics
According to the Canada 2021 Census

Ethnic groups: 54.4% White, 9.6% Black, 17.7% South Asian, 3.6% Filipino, 2.8% Chinese, 1.8% West Asian, 1.6% Indigenous, 1.4% Arab, 1.3% Latin American
Languages: 72.7% English, 2.5% Tamil, 2.5% Urdu, 1.5% Tagalog, 1.1% French, 1.0% Italian, 1.0% Arabic
Religions: 54.0% Christian (24.6% Catholic, 4.2% Anglican, 4.0% United Church, 3.5% Christian Orthodox, 1.8% Pentecostal, 1.7% Presbyterian, 1.4% Baptist, 12.8% Other), 10.5% Muslim, 6.9% Hindu, 26.5% None
Median income: $45,600 (2020)
Average income: $61,350 (2020)

Members of Parliament
This riding has elected the following Members of Parliament:

Election results

References

Ontario federal electoral districts
Pickering, Ontario
2013 establishments in Ontario